Istočno Novo Sarajevo (lit. "East New Sarajevo") is a municipality of the city of Istočno Sarajevo located in Republika Srpska, an entity of Bosnia and Herzegovina. As of 2013, it has a population of 10,642 inhabitants.

It was created from part of the pre-war municipality of Novo Sarajevo (the other part of the pre-war municipality is now in the City of Sarajevo in the Federation of Bosnia and Herzegovina).
The municipality was formerly known as Srpsko Novo Sarajevo ("Serb New Sarajevo") and is still informally known as Lukavica (Serbian Cyrillic: Лукавица).
From 2012 till 2020, the mayor was Ljubiša Ćosić (SNSD).
On 27 June 2014, a statue to Gavrilo Princip was inaugurated in Lukavica. The city park (gradski park) was also named after Princip.

In East New Sarajevo there is one elementary school "Sveti Sava" (Grades 1–9) and one high school "Srednja stručna škola 28. Juni". Four faculties of the University of East Sarajevo are situated in the municipality: the Faculty of Electrical Engineering, 
Faculty of Mechanical Engineering, Music Academy and Faculty of Agriculture.

The municipality also hosts the headquarters of the State Investigation and Protection Agency (SIPA) and of the Institute for Textbooks and Teaching Aids (Zavod za udžbenike, INS).

The local football club is Slavija Istočno Sarajevo that plays in the second League of Bosnia and Herzegovina.
Basketball Club Slavija is a basketball club from the City of East Sarajevo (East New Sarajevo municipality) that competes in the National Championship of Bosnia and Herzegovina.

Demographics

Population

Ethnic composition

Gallery

References

External links

 Official website

Municipalities of Republika Srpska
Populated places in Istočno Novo Sarajevo
Istočno Sarajevo